The following is a timeline of the history of the city of Zakho, Iraq.

Prior to 20th century
 641 – Zakho Great Mosque built after Islamic army had occupied Zakho
 1041 – Hasseniya Khabur was destroyed by Turkman forces called Ghuzz Forces
 1507 – Safavid captured Zakho
 1515 – The Ottoman Empire captured Zakho .
 1544 – Zakho became Sanjak
 1844 – English traveler William Francis Ainsworth visits Zakho
 1864 – Zakho was becoming District followed Mosul Eyalet

20th century
 1918
 November 30: Ottoman forces withdraw from Zakho and the British assume control over the city.
 1919 – The British Governor of Zakho Captin Persson assassinated By Hasso Dino .
 1922 – The first elementary school was opening.
 1923
 The King of Iraq Faisal visited Zakho city.
 The first Iron bridge built
 1934 – Al Saadun Bridge opened
 1946 – Khabur hotel became first hotel was opening in Zakho 
 1970 – The first Television brought to the city
 1987 
 Qumri Ismael Haji was executed
 Zakho FC (football club) formed.
 1991
 March 13: People in the Zakho attacked the Iraqi military bases and stormed government buildings and took control of the town and inflicted heavy damage on government forces
 April 1: The Iraqi forces had recapture the city
 April 21: The Coalition forces had dismissed The Iraqi forces from Zakho
 1995 –  A car bomb exploded in Zakho on February 27

21st century
 2011 – Many stores selling alcohol and massage parlours crashed by many angry Kurds
 2013 – The University of Zakho opened
 2015 – The Zakho International Stadium opened on June 3
 2018 – Zakho tunnel opened on September 25
 2021 -The City becoming independent administration belong Duhok Governorate

References

Years in Iraq
Zakho
Zakho
Iraqi Kurdistan